Khatkura railway station is a railway station on Howrah–Nagpur–Mumbai line under Kharagpur railway division of South Eastern Railway zone. It is situated at Khatkura in Jhargram district in the Indian state of West Bengal.

References

Railway stations in Jhargram district
Kharagpur railway division